The following is a timeline of the history of the city of Mexico City, Mexico.

Prior to 19th century

 1325 – Tenochtitlán founded by Aztecs.
 1521 – City captured and sacked by Spanish forces led by Cortés.
 1522 - National Palace (Mexico) construction starts.
 1524 – México Tenochtitlán municipality established.
 1526 - Santo Domingo (Mexico City) established. 
 1527 – Spanish Royal Audiencia of Mexico established.
 1537 – Mint built.
 1539 - Printer Juan Pablos active.
 1543 – Convento Grande de San Francisco painting school established (approximate date).
 1551 – Royal and Pontifical University of Mexico founded.
 1573 – Mexico City Metropolitan Cathedral construction starts.
 1588 – San Ildefonso College founded by Jesuits.
 1592
 Consulado established.
 Alameda Central park created.
 1629 – Flood.
 1645 – Metropolitan Cathedral consecrated.
 1690 – Church of San Bernardo consecrated.
 1692 – Uprising against Spanish rule.
 1720 – Church of La Profesa dedicated.
 1736 – Palace of the Inquisition built.
 1752 – Teatro Principal built.
 1766 – House of the Marquis of Uluapa built.
 1776 – National Pawn Shop opens.
 1777 – Sacro y Real Monte Pío de Animas founded.
 1778
 Academy of San Carlos founded.
 La Enseñanza Church consecrated.
 1785 – Palace of Iturbide (residence) built.
 1790 – Population: 112,926.

19th century
 1813
 Mexico City Metropolitan Cathedral construction completed.
 School of Mines built.
 1824 – Federal District created.
 1826 - El Iris literary magazine in publication.
 1831 - El Cocinero Mexicano (cookbook) published.
 1833 – National Institute of Geography and Statistics established.
 1847
 August 19–20: Battle of Contreras.
 September 8–15: Battle for Mexico City.
 1848 – February 2: Treaty of Guadalupe Hidalgo signed, ending the Mexican–American War.
 1856 - Flood.
 1863
 French troops occupied Mexico City.
 La Merced Market buildings constructed.
 1864 - Maximilian I of Mexico, archduke of Austria, crowned emperor of Mexico.
 1865 
 Royal and Pontifical University of Mexico closed.
 Drogueria de la Profesa (drugstore) in business.
 1866 – National Conservatory of Music founded.
 1867 - (2ist of June) Porfirio Díaz takes power. 
 1868 - La Concordia restaurant in business.
 1875 – Arbeu Theatre opens.
 1887
 Fabrica Linera (textile mill) established.
 Monument to Cuauhtémoc erected.
 1888 – Posada printer in business.
 1891 – El Palacio de Hierro (shop) in business.
 1900
 Prison built.
 Population: 344,721.

20th century

 1903 – Mexico City Banking Co. established.
 1905 – General Hospital of Mexico opens.
 1907 – Post office built.
 1909 - (30th & 3ist July) Earthquake.
 1910 – 
 El Àngel monument erected on Paseo de la Reforma.
 National Autonomous University of Mexico founded, in its modern form.
 1917 – Excélsior newspaper begins publication.
 1918 – Teatro Esperanza Iris opens.
 1919 – Academia Mexicana de la Historia established.
 1921 – Secretariat of Public Education headquartered in city.
 1928
 Federal District of Mexico City divided into 80 boroughs.
 Teatro Ulises active.
 1930 – La Aficion newspaper begins publication.
 1932 – Teatro Orientación founded.
 1934 – Palacio de Bellas Artes inaugurated.
 1937
 Taller de Gráfica Popular established.
 Hotel Majestic opens in the Portal de Mercaderes.
 1940
 21 August: Leon Trotsky assassinated.
 Palacio Chino (cinema) opens.
 1941 – Supreme Court of Justice of the Nation building constructed.
 1943
 Colegio Nacional founded.
 Tepeyac Teatro opens.
 1945 – Bimbo Bread in business.
 1947 – Servicio de Transportes Eléctricos begins operation.
 1948 – New Federal District building constructed.
 1950 - Population: 2,233,709.
 1952 – National Auditorium opens.
 1954 – Ciudad Universitaria campus built in Coyoacán.
 1957 – July 28: Earthquake.
 1960 – Cine Latino (cinema) opens.
 1962
 Library of the Congress of Mexico established.
 El Día newspaper begins publication.
 1964 – Museum of the City of Mexico and National Museum of Anthropology inaugurated.
 1966 - Estadio Azteca (stadium) opens.
 1968
 October 2: Tlatelolco massacre.
 October: 1968 Summer Olympics held.
 1969
 First line of Mexico City Metro (subway system) opens.
 Sister city relationship established with Los Angeles, USA.
 1971
 June 10: Corpus Christi massacre.
 Polyforum Cultural Siqueiros opens.
 1978
 Templo Mayor excavated.
 Mexico City Philharmonic Orchestra founded.
 1980
 Cuestion newspaper begins publication.
 El Parnaso bookshop in business.
 1982
 Central de Abasto (market) built.
 National Museum of Art opens.
 1985 – September 19: 1985 Mexico City earthquake.
 1986 
Franz Mayer Museum opens.
1986 FIFA World Cup Final held at Estadio Azteca.
 1990 – Population: 8,235,744; metro 15,047,685.
 1992 – Supreme Court built.
 1993 – Cafebrería el Péndulo bookshop/cafe opens.
 1995 – World Trade Center Mexico City opens.
 1997 – Cuauhtémoc Cárdenas elected Head of Government of the Federal District.
 2000 – Andrés Manuel López Obrador becomes Head of Government of the Federal District.

21st century
 2001 – Pujol restaurant in business.
 2003 – Policia de Barrio program established.
 2004 – Centro Cultural Universitario Tlatelolco established.
 2005
 Mexico City Metrobús begins operating.
 Alejandro Encinas Rodríguez becomes interim Head of Government of the Federal District, succeeded by reinstated Andrés Manuel López Obrador.
 2006
 Marcelo Ebrard is elected Head of Government of the Federal District.
 Centro Cultural Bella Epoca bookshop opens.
 2008 – November 4: Plane crash in Las Lomas.
 2010 – Population: 8,851,080; metro 20,116,842.
 2012
 Homeless World Cup football contest held.
 Mexico City Arena opens.
 Miguel Ángel Mancera becomes Head of Government of the Federal District.
 2013 – January 31: Torre Ejecutiva Pemex explosion
 2018
 José Ramón Amieva becomes interim Head of Government of the Federal District
 Claudia Sheinbaum is elected Head of Government of the Federal District
 2020 – COVID-19 pandemic
 2021 – Mexico City Metro overpass collapse

See also
 History of Mexico City
 Index of Mexico-related articles
 Mexico City's boroughs
 List of heads of government of the Mexican Federal District
 Chronology of the Mexican Federal District 
 Tenochtitlan, 1325-1521
 Greater Mexico City

References

This article incorporates information from the Spanish Wikipedia.

Bibliography

in English

Published before 20th century

Published in 20th century
1900s-1950s
 
 
 
 
 
 
 
 
  (describes Mexico City)

1960s-1990s
 Frieden, Bernard. The search for housing policy in Mexico City. Town Planning Review. 36 (1965)
 
 
 Lourdes Beneria and Martha Roldan. 1987. The Crossroads of Class and Gender: Industrial Homework, Subcontracting, and Household Dynamics in Mexico City. Chicago: University of Chicago Press.
La Capital: The Biography of Mexico City, Jonathan Kandell. New York: Random House, 1988 
 
 
 
 Diana Davis. Social Construction of Mexico City. Journal of Urban History. 24 (1998), 364-415

Published in 21st century

In Spanish

External links

 Europeana. Items related to Mexico City, various dates.
 Digital Public Library of America. Items related to Mexico City, various dates
 , ca.1880-1957

 
Mexico City
Mexico City
Mexico City